Wardrope can refer to:

People
 David Wardrope Wallace
 George Wardrope
 Thomas Wardrope Eadie
 Willie Wardrope, Scottish footballer

Other
 Wardrope is the name of a track in the 1996 Hooverphonic album A New Stereophonic Sound Spectacular